Hersh Shefrin (born in Winnipeg, Manitoba) is a Canadian economist best known for his pioneering work in behavioral finance.

Shefrin received his B.S. from University of Manitoba in 1970.  At the University of Waterloo in 1971 he received his M.S. in mathematics. He then obtained a Ph.D. in economics from the London School of Economics in 1974, after which he became assistant professor at the University of Rochester. In 1979 he was appointed professor at the Santa Clara University, first in the department of economics and then in 1990 to the department of finance.

Shefrin holds an honorary doctorate from the University of Oulu, Finland.

Shefrin's research articles have been published in many economics and finance journals, in particular: the Journal of Finance, the Journal of Financial Economics, the Review of Financial Studies, the Journal of Financial and Quantitative Analysis, Financial Management, the Financial Analysts Journal, and the Journal of Portfolio Management. Shefrin has written a number of influential books on behavioral finance and its applications to corporate finance and corporate culture.

Shefrin and his wife, Arna, were married in 1970.

Books
 Behavioral Corporate Finance, 2006. McGraw-Hill/Irwin
 A Behavioral Approach to Asset Pricing Theory, 2005. Elsevier; 2nd edition in 2008.
 Ending the Management Illusion, 2008. McGraw-Hill
 Beyond Greed and Fear: Understanding Behavioral Finance and the Psychology of Investing, Boston, MA: Harvard Business School Press, 1999. Revised version published 2002, New York: Oxford University Press

Selected articles
 "An Economic Theory of Self-Control", with R. Thaler, Journal of Political Economy, 1981.
 "The Disposition to Sell Winners Too Early and Ride Losers Too Long:  Theory and Evidence", with M. Statman, Journal of Finance, Vol. XL, No. 3, 1985. 
 "Behavioral Capital Asset Pricing Theory", with M. Statman, Journal of Financial and Quantitative Analysis, September, 1994. 
 "The Contributions of Daniel Kahneman and Amos Tversky", with Meir Statman. Journal of Behavioral Finance, 2003.

See also
 List of University of Waterloo people

External links
 Curriculum Vitae
 Home page at the Santa Clara University

Living people
Alumni of the London School of Economics
Behavioral economists
Behavioral finance
Canadian economists
People from Winnipeg
Santa Clara University faculty
Santa Clara University people
University of Rochester faculty
University of Waterloo alumni
Year of birth missing (living people)